State Route 32 (SR 32) is an east–west state highway in the U.S. State of California which is routed from Interstate 5 in Orland, across the Sacramento Valley and through Chico, through the northern Sierra Nevada, and ending at SR 36 and SR 89 in eastern Tehama County.

Route description
SR 32 begins in Orland at a junction with I-5 as Newville Road. The highway continues east out of Orland for several miles before entering Hamilton City and intersecting SR 45. SR 32 then crosses the Sacramento River into Butte County. East of here, SR 32 enters the city of Chico, becoming Walnut Street before it becomes a one-way couplet as 8th and 9th Streets through downtown Chico. Shortly after the diamond interchange with the SR 99 freeway, 8th and 9th Streets merge into one road and SR 32 continues east out of the Chico city limits. 

Following this, SR 32 turns to the northeast, passing through the communities of Forest Ranch and West Branch before crossing into Tehama County and eventually Lassen National Forest. SR 32 terminates at an intersection with SR 89 and SR 36.

Different road names include Nord Avenue (Chico), Walnut Street (Chico), West Eighth and Ninth Streets (Chico), East Eighth and Ninth Streets (Chico), Deer Creek Highway (Chico), East and West Sixth Street (Hamilton City), Walker Street (Orland), Newville Road (Orland) and County Road 200.

SR 32 is part of the California Freeway and Expressway System, and between I-5 and SR 99 is part of the National Highway System, a network of highways that are considered essential to the country's economy, defense, and mobility by the Federal Highway Administration.

Major intersections

See also

References

External links

Caltrans: Route 32 highway conditions
California Highways: SR 32
California @ AARoads.com - State Route 32

032
State Route 032
State Route 032
State Route 032
State Route 032